Alexander McGregor Grant  (29 July 1888 – 25 June 1973) was a New Zealand surgeon, horse-racing administrator, racehorse owner and breeder.

He was born in Casterton, Victoria, Australia on 29 July 1888. Before moving to New Zealand he was an Australian rules footballer who played for the University Football Club in the Victorian Football League (VFL).

He also served in World War I with the No. 3 New Zealand Field Ambulance.

In the 1963 Queen's Birthday Honours, Grant was appointed a Commander of the Order of the British Empire, for services to medicine and racing.

References

1888 births
1973 deaths
New Zealand racehorse owners and breeders
New Zealand surgeons
People from Casterton, Victoria
Australian emigrants to New Zealand
Australian rules footballers from Victoria (Australia)
University Football Club players
University of Melbourne alumni
New Zealand Commanders of the Order of the British Empire
20th-century surgeons